Müfit Kayacan (born 17 January 1959) is a Turkish actor and theatre director.

Life and career 
Kayacan was born on 17 January 1959 in Kaş, Turkey. He is a graduate of Adana Çukurova University with a degree in industrial engineering. He is one of the founders of Antalya Metropolitan Municipality City Theaters (AŞT), where he played his first role in 1983, and was the general art director for 25 years. During this period, he took part in 32 different plays and directed 25 plays. At the same time, he worked as the Head of Cultural Services Department in Antalya Metropolitan Municipality for 10 years. The National Theater Festival for High Schools, one of the many festivals initiated during his duty, started in 1993 for the first time with the participation of 6 high schools. Kayacan, who was also a jury member at the Golden Orange Film Festival, is also one of the creators of the Likya Seyirlik Games Festival. Kayacan is also one of the executives of Women Meet with Theater project. He has also appeared in numerous TV series and movies.

Kayacan is married with two children. In 2012, he was nominated for the "Best Actor in a Musical or Comedy" award at the 16th Afife Theatre Awards for his role as "Abdi" in Kanlı Nigâr, which he took to stage at Adım Theatre and also starred in.

Filmography

Film

Television

Theatre

As actor 
 Ormanın Bekçileri (1983) / writer: Ülker Köksal
 Küçük Nasreddin (1984) / writer: Serpil Akıllıoğlu
 Rumuz Goncagül (1984) / writer: Oktay Arayıcı
 Becerikli Kanguru (1985) / writer: Ahmet Önel
 Topuzlu (1985) / writer: Hidayet Sayın
 Köşe Kapmaca (1986) / writer: Hidayet Sayın
 Kırmızı Sokağın Suzanı (1987) / writer: Erdoğan Aytekin
 Keşanlı Ali Destanı (1988) / writer: Haldun Taner
 Gözlerimi Kaparım Vazifemi Yaparım (1989) / writer: Haldun Taner
 Ay Işığında Şamata (1990) / writer: Haldun Taner
 Canlar Ölesi Değil (1990) / writer: Haldun Taner
 Sayım Suyum Yok (1990) / writer: Ahmet Önel
 Fehim Paşa Konağı (1991) / writer: Turgut Özakman
 Kanlı Nigar (1992) / writer: Sadık Şendil
 Nalınlar (1993) / writer: Necati Cumali
 Öykülerin Azizliği (1995) / writer: M. Taner Çelik
 Köşe Kapmaca (1996) / writer: Hidayet Sayın
 Düğün Ya Da Davul (1997) / writer: Haşmet Zeybek
 Aşk Grevi (1998) / writer: Savaş Aykılıç
 Politikada Bir Sarı Çizmeli (1999) / writer: Recep Bilginer
 Cimri (2000) / writer: Moliere
 Yobaz (2001) / writer: Metin Balay
 Töre (2002) / writer: Turgut Özakman
 Rumuz Goncagül (2002) / writer: Oktay Arayıcı
 Komşu Köyün Delisi (2003) / writer: Üstün Dökmen
 Definename (2004) / writer: Sinan Bayraktar
 Vatan Kurtaran Şaban (2009) / writer: Haldun Taner
 Fehim Paşa Konağı (2010) / writer: Turgut Özakman
 İnadına Yaşamak (2011) / writer: Metin Balay
 Heccav Yahut Şair Eşref'in Esrarengiz Macerası (2012) / writer: Semih Çelenk
 Carmela y Paolino (2013) / writer: Jose Sanchis Sinisterre
 Azizname (2014) / writer: M. Taner Çelik
 Entrikalı Dolap Komedyası (2016)
 Bu da Geçer Yahu (2018)

As director 
 Becerikli Kanguru (1985) / writer: Ahmet Önel
 Kırmızı Sokağın Suzanı (1987) / writer: Erdoğan Aytekin
 Keşanlı Ali Destanı (1988) / writer: Haldun Taner
 Gözlerimi Kaparım Vazifemi Yaparım (1989) / writer: Haldun Taner
 Ay Işığında Şamata (1990) / writer: Haldun Taner
 Canlar Ölesi Değil (1990) / writer: Haldun Taner
 Sayım Suyum Yok (1990) / writer: Ahmet Önel
 Fehim Paşa Konağı (1991) / writer: Turgut Özakman
 Kanlı Nigar (1992) / writer: Sadık Şendil
 Nalınlar (1993) / writer: Necati Cumalı
 Politikada Bir Sarı Çizmeli (1999) / writer: Recep Bilginer 
 Töre (2002) / writer: Turgut Özakman 
 Aşk Grevi (2010) / writer: Savaş Aykılıç

Awards and nominations 
 16th Afife Theatre Awards - "Best Actor in a Musical or Comedy" (nom) - Kanlı Nigar (2012)
 Direct Audience Awards - "Best Actor" - Vatan Kurtaran Şaban (2009, Antalya BB City Theatre)
 Golden Mask Theatre Awards Mersin - "Best Director" - Keşanlı Ali Destanı (1989, Antalya BB City Theatre)

References

External links 
 

Living people
1959 births
Çukurova University alumni
Turkish male stage actors
Turkish male television actors
Turkish male film actors
Turkish theatre directors
People from Antalya Province